Events in the year 2017 in Colombia.

Incumbents
 President: Juan Manuel Santos
 Vice President: 
 until 21 March: Germán Vargas Lleras 
 21 March-29 March: vacant
 starting 29 March: Oscar Naranjo

Events
7 January – the Reinado Internacional del Café 2017, held in Manizales

Deaths

29 January – Elkin Ramírez, singer-songwriter (b. 1962).
5 June –  Marcos Coll, footballer (b. 1935)

References

 
2010s in Colombia
Years of the 21st century in Colombia
Colombia
Colombia